Ilija Bozoljac (born 2 August 1985) is a former Serbian professional tennis player and coach.

On 29 January 2007, Bozoljac reached his best singles ranking of world No. 101. On 22 February 2016, he peaked at world No. 99 in the doubles rankings.

His nickname is Bozo.

Professional career

2006
2006 was arguably Bozoljac's best year. In January, he had his best result at the ATP level in Zagreb, beating no. 170 Dudi Sela to qualify, and then beating no. 77 Daniele Bracciali and no. 34 Feliciano López, before losing to no. 81 Novak Djokovic in the quarterfinals.

2008
In May, Bozoljac narrowly missed qualifying into the 2008 French Open, losing to no. 75 Eduardo Schwank in the qualifying round.

In June, Bozoljac entered the main draw of 2008 Wimbledon as a lucky loser, after beating Nick Monroe and Robert Smeets, but losing to Stefano Galvani in the qualifying round in five sets.

2010
Bozoljac qualified for Wimbledon and progressed to the second round, where he was defeated in four tight sets by defending champion Roger Federer.

He was a reserve player on the Serbia Davis Cup team when they won the Davis Cup title.

2013
Bozoljac began 2013 by returning to the ITF Men's circuit, taking three singles titles in the opening three months.

In April, Ilija and his doubles partner Nenad Zimonjić beat Bob and Mike Bryan in the Davis Cup World Group quarterfinals against the United States, winning 7–6(5), 7–6(1), 5–7, 4–6, 15–13 in a performance described by Sports Illustrated as "Bozo goes Beast Mode...there was Bozoljac playing out of his mind in a five-set win that left everyone shaking their heads". Bozoljac was praised by the Bryan brothers and by U.S. team captain Jim Courier, who said "Let's all tip our hats to his performance. We had him 15-30 a couple times, and the guy came up with some incredible shots."

Style of play
Bozoljac is known for his unique style of play. He often changes the way he performs forehands and backhands, hitting double-handed forehands and single-handed backhands. He also has a strong serve, but he has to limit the strength of his serve due to a back injury. Nevertheless, he still serves well over 200 km/h.

Personal life
Bozoljac was born on August, 2, 1985 in Aleksandrovac, Serbia, to Jelena and Miroljub Bozoljac. He started playing tennis in TK Partizan in Belgrade and turned pro in 2002. He's married to Andrijana Basarić since 2011 and they have two daughters named Lola (b. 2012) and Nika (b. 2015). They live in Belgrade, Serbia.

Team competition finals

ATP Challenger Tour and ITF Futures finals

Singles: 25 (13–12)

Doubles: 27 (17–10)

Performance timelines

Singles 
Current through the 2015 Banja Luka Challenger.

{|class=wikitable style=text-align:center;font-size:97%
!Tournament!!2003!!2004!!2005!!2006!!2007!!2008!!2009!!2010!!2011!!2012!!2013!!2014!!2015!!
|-
|colspan=15 align=left|Grand Slam tournaments
|-
|bgcolor=efefef align=left|Australian Open
|A
|A
|A
|bgcolor=ecf2ff|Q2
|bgcolor=afeeee|2R
|A
|bgcolor=ecf2ff|Q1
|bgcolor=ecf2ff|Q1
|bgcolor=ecf2ff|Q2
|A
|A
|bgcolor=ecf2ff|Q2
|bgcolor=ecf2ff|Q1
|bgcolor=efefef|1–1
|-
|bgcolor=efefef align=left|French Open
|A
|A
|A
|bgcolor=afeeee|2R
|bgcolor=ecf2ff|Q1
|bgcolor=ecf2ff|Q3
|bgcolor=afeeee|1R
|bgcolor=ecf2ff|Q2
|bgcolor=ecf2ff|Q1
|A
|A
|bgcolor=ecf2ff|Q1
|A
|bgcolor=efefef|1–2
|-
|bgcolor=efefef align=left|Wimbledon
|A
|A
|A
|bgcolor=ecf2ff|Q2
|bgcolor=ecf2ff|Q1
|bgcolor=afeeee|2R
|bgcolor=ecf2ff|Q2
|bgcolor=afeeee|2R
|bgcolor=ecf2ff|Q1
|A
|A
|bgcolor=ecf2ff|Q1
|A
|bgcolor=efefef|2–2
|-
|bgcolor=efefef align=left|US Open
|A
|A
|A
|bgcolor=ecf2ff|Q2
|bgcolor=ecf2ff|Q1
|bgcolor=ecf2ff|Q1
|A
|bgcolor=ecf2ff|Q3
|bgcolor=ecf2ff|Q3
|A
|A
|bgcolor=ecf2ff|Q1
|A
|bgcolor=efefef|0–0
|-
!style=text-align:left|Win–loss
!0–0
!0–0
!0–0
!1–1
!1–1
!1–1
!0–1
!1–1
!0–0
!0–0
!0–0
!0–0
!0–0
!4–5
|-
|colspan=15 align=left|National representation
|-
|bgcolor=efefef align=left|Davis Cup
|style="background:#ECF2FF;|Z2
|A
|A
|style="background:#ECF2FF;|PO
|style="background:#ECF2FF;|PO
|A
|bgcolor=afeeee|1R
|Alt
|bgcolor=yellow|SF
|bgcolor=ffebcd|QF
|bgcolor=thistle|F
|bgcolor=afeeee|1R
|A
|bgcolor=efefef|3–2
|-
!style=text-align:left|Win–loss
!1–0
!0–0
!0–0
!0–1
!1–0
!0–0
!1–0
!0–0
!0–0
!0–0
!0–0
!0–1
!0–0
!3–2
|-
|colspan=15 align=left|ATP Masters Series 1000
|-
|bgcolor=efefef align=left|Indian Wells Masters
|A
|A
|A
|A
|bgcolor=ecf2ff|Q1
|A
|A
|A
|A
|A
|A
|A
|A
|bgcolor=efefef|0–0
|-
|bgcolor=efefef align=left|Monte-Carlo Masters
|A
|A
|A
|A
|bgcolor=ecf2ff|Q2
|A
|A
|A
|A
|A
|A
|A
|A
|bgcolor=efefef|0–0
|-
|bgcolor=efefef align=left|Madrid Open1
|A
|A
|A
|bgcolor=ecf2ff|Q2
|A
|A
|A
|bgcolor=ecf2ff|Q1
|A
|A
|A
|A
|A
|bgcolor=efefef|0–0
|-
|bgcolor=efefef align=left|Canadian Open
|A
|A
|A
|A
|A
|A
|A
|bgcolor=ecf2ff|Q1
|A
|A
|A
|A
|A
|bgcolor=efefef|0–0
|-
!style=text-align:left|Win–loss
!0–0
!0–0
!0–0
!0–0
!0–0
!0–0
!0–0
!0–0
!0–0
!0–0
!0–0
!0–0
!0–0
!0–0
|-
| colspan="15" style="text-align:left" |Career statistics
|-bgcolor=efefef 
|align=left|Tournaments
|0
|0
|1
|2
|5
|1
|1
|4
|1
|0
|3
|0
|0
|colspan=2|18
|-
!style=text-align:left|Overall win–loss
!1–0
!0–0
!1–1
!3–3
!2–5
!1–1
!1–1
!1–4
!1–1
!0–0
!0–3
!0–1
!0–0
!colspan=2|11–20
|-bgcolor=efefef 
|align=left|Year-end ranking
|834
|567
|207
|136
|182
|141
|183
|149
|227
|485
|237
|207
|852
|colspan=2|35%
|}
1 Held as Hamburg Masters (outdoor clay) until 2008, Madrid Masters (outdoor clay) 2009 – present.

DoublesCurrent through 2018 Wimbledon Championships.

References

External links

 
 
 
 
 

1985 births
Living people
Serbian male tennis players
Serbian tennis coaches
Serbia and Montenegro male tennis players
Yugoslav male tennis players
People from Aleksandrovac